Coleophora climacopterae is a moth of the family Coleophoridae. It is found in Turkestan, Kyrgyzstan and China.

The larvae feed on Climacopiera species. They feed inside the fruit of their host plant, moving from one fruit to another without emerging to the surface. The larvae are initially dull white, but later turn yellow with a chocolate-brown head. They can be found in October.

References

climacopterae
Moths of Asia